Take It to the Floor is the debut studio album by the American electronic music group Cash Cash. It was released on December 23, 2008 through Universal Republic Records.

Release
Take It to the Floor was released digitally on December 23, 2008 and released physically on January 20, 2009 by Universal Republic Records. It features five songs previously released on their Cash Cash EP, one of them being re-recorded. On December 13, 2008, it was announced on their blog that their full-length album would be out on December 23, 2008. The album title is taken from the lyrics of the first track "Breakout." The album was recorded in Anntenna Studios, Digital Heart Beat Studios and Fresh Kills Studio. "Party in Your Bedroom" was released to contemporary hit radio in the United States on April 14, 2009. The music video for the song was directed by Brendan Kyle Cochrane.

In April and May 2009, the band supported Kevin Rudolf on his Let It Rock Tour in the US. The group also went on tour with Metro Station and Tyga to support the album. Between late June and late August, the band performed on the Warped Tour.

Reception

Tim Sendra of AllMusic gave a rating of 3.5 stars, saying that "if you want a quick and most likely short-lived blast of pop nonsense, the album is pretty brilliant." He states, "the band's one perfect moment, 'Party in Your Bedroom,' it's awesome." Although also remarking that the rest of the album does not live up to the song, he ends off by saying, "Cash Cash are unabashedly pop and that's nothing to be ashamed of when you do it as well as they do here."

Track listing

Personnel
Credits for Take It to the Floor adapted from AllMusic.
 Jean Paul Makhlouf – lead vocals, guitar, mixing
 Alex Luke Makhlouf – keyboard, programming, backing vocals
 Sam Frisch – bass, backing vocals, programming, package design
 Anthony Villacari – drums
 S*A*M and SLUGGO – producer, engineer, co-writer ("Party in Your Bedroom")
 Jeff Turzo and Matt Mahaffey – producer, engineer, keyboards
 Ted Jenson – mastering
 Mike Doerr – photo editing
 Kellyann Petry – photography
 Nicholas Routzen – inlay photography
 Ben Adelson – A&R

Charts

References

External links 
Official Myspace
Official website
Zune

2008 debut albums
Cash Cash albums
Universal Republic Records albums